Paulo Jorge Barros Pimentel Lima (born 5 June 1998) is a Portuguese footballer who plays for Houston Dynamo 2 in the MLS Next Pro.

Career

Early career 
Lima played as part of the Real academy for six years and later with Sporting CP for four years. At Sporting, Lima won on a U-19 National Championship and a U-16 National Championship, as well as appearing on the bench a single time with Sporting CP B in 2016. After leaving Sporting, Lima played a season with Sintrense in the Campeonato de Portugal.

United States college and amateur 
In 2018, Lima made the move to the United States to play college soccer at Providence College. Here he went on to make 50 appearances for the Friars, scoring 13 goals and tallying six assists. In 2019, he was named to the All-Big East second team and was named the team's Offensive Most Valuable Player, and in his junior and senior years Lima was named to the All-Big East first team.

While at college, Lima also played in the USL League Two with Boston Bolts, where he made three appearances.

Professional 
On 11 January 2022, Lima was selected 32nd overall in the 2022 MLS SuperDraft by Houston Dynamo. On 19 February 2022, Lima signed professionally with Houston's MLS Next Pro side Houston Dynamo 2.

References

External links 
 Paulo Jorge Barros Pimentel Lima Sporting CP bio
 Paulo Lima - Men's Soccer Providence bio
 Paulo Lima | MLSsoccer.com MLS Next Pro bio

1998 births
Living people
Association football midfielders
Boston Bolts players
Expatriate soccer players in the United States
Houston Dynamo FC draft picks
MLS Next Pro players
Portuguese expatriate footballers
Portuguese expatriate sportspeople in the United States
Portuguese footballers
Providence Friars men's soccer players
Real S.C. players
Sporting CP footballers
Sportspeople from Lisbon District
S.U. Sintrense players
USL League Two players